Max-Peter Ratzel (born in 1949 in Dillingen/Saar, Germany) is a German law enforcement officer, and a former Director of Europol, the European Union law enforcement agency that handles criminal intelligence.

Education 
Director Ratzel studied mathematics and physics in the University of Saarbrücken and served in the German Air Force.

Career 
The career of Director Ratzel started in the Bundeskriminalamt (Federal Criminal Police Office, Wiesbaden, Germany) in 1976, as the Head of the Organised and General Crime Department. His unit which was specialised in combating child pornography, Internet crime, counterfeit money and human trafficking, had over 850 police officers under his supervision.

Europol 
On February 24, 2005, the Justice and Home Affairs Council selected Director Ratzel as the successor of Director Storbeck as the General Director of Europol. He took up his position on April 16, 2005.

In April 2009, he was succeeded by Director Wainwright.

After retiring as a civil servant Ratzel founded a security company.

See also 
 B.K.A.
 Europol

External links 
 Biography of Director Ratzel from germany-info.org
 Director Ratzel in the Scotsman
 Press Conference with Director Ratzel in Washington, DC
 Director Ratzel in the European Serious Organised Crime Conference
 Director Ratzel in the 2011 Conference for Police and Law Enforcement Officers in Canada
 Director Ratzel in Deutsche Welle
 Director Ratzel in Spiegel Magazine
 Resume of Director Ratzel

Police detectives
German police chiefs
1949 births
Living people
Law enforcement in Europe
Europol